Hariton Paşovschi (born 6 April 1935) is a Romanian bobsledder. He competed in the two-man and the four-man events at the 1964 Winter Olympics.

References

1935 births
Living people
Romanian male bobsledders
Olympic bobsledders of Romania
Bobsledders at the 1964 Winter Olympics
Sportspeople from Craiova